Juan José Gómez Centurión (born May 26, 1958 in Buenos Aires) is an Argentinian soldier and politician.

He is a retired officer of the Argentine Army, a veteran of the Falklands War, where he received the Cross to the Heroic Valour in Combat, the highest military distinction.

Politics
He was a candidate for President of Argentina by the NOS Front for the 2019 elections.

References

1958 births
Living people
Argentine politicians
Argentine Army officers
Argentine anti-communists
Far-right politics in Argentina
Argentine military personnel of the Falklands War